41st London Film Critics' Circle Awards
7 February 2021

Film of the Year:
Nomadland

British/Irish Film of the Year:
Saint Maud

The 41st London Film Critics' Circle Awards honoured the best in film of 2020, as chosen by the London Film Critics' Circle. The event was held virtually on the Critics' Circle's YouTube channel for the first time on 7 February 2021, with awards presented by member critics who serve on the event's organising committee and acceptance videos from almost all of the winners. An in-person celebration with nominees and winners occurred later in the year along with long-time sponsors The May Fair Hotel and Audi. The nominations were announced on 12 January 2021.

Winners and nominees

Winners are listed first and highlighted with boldface.

References

External links
 Official site

2
2020 film awards
2020 in British cinema
2021 in London
February 2021 events in the United Kingdom
2020 awards in the United Kingdom